Alwyne Statham (28 January 1920 – 2003) was an English professional footballer who played in the Football League for Mansfield Town.

References

1920 births
2003 deaths
English footballers
Association football wing halves
English Football League players
Wolverhampton Wanderers F.C. players
Mansfield Town F.C. players